Zhenwu Pavilion is a Chinese pavilion located in Rong County, Guangxi. Alongside Yuejiang Tower, Xie Tiao Tower and Zhenhai Tower, it is one of the Four Great Towers of Jiangnan.

History 
The original pavilion dates back to the 8th century, founded by Yuan Jie, a poet and official of the Tang dynasty (618–907).

In 1377, at the dawn of the Ming dynasty (1368–1644), local officials built a Taoist temple named "Xuanwu Palace" on the former site. It was enlarged in 1573, in the ruling of Wanli Emperor, and renamed "Zhenwu Pavilion", which is still in use now.

On 23 February 1982, it was listed among the second batch of "Major National Historical and Cultural Sites in Guangxi" by the State Council of China. On 25 August 2017, it has been rated as a national AAAA level scenic spot by the China National Tourism Administration.

Architecture 
Zhenwu Pavilion is a three-story wooden structure with a gable and hip roof.

References 

Pavilions
Rong County, Guangxi
Tourist attractions in Yulin, Guangxi
Buildings and structures in Yulin, Guangxi